Mind Funk (spelled Mindfunk on later releases) was an American rock band, containing members of Chemical Waste and several other bands. The band was originally known as "Mind Fuck" but were forced by Epic Records to change their name. They signed to the Sony/Epic record label and released their self-titled debut album in 1991. Guitarist Jason Everman, known for stints on guitar and bass with Nirvana and Soundgarden, joined and later left in September 1994 to join the US Army 2nd Ranger Battalion and the Special Forces. Louis Svitek went on to later perform with Ministry and has since opened his new recording studio and label, Wu-Li Records. John Monte also later performed with Ministry.

Members

Current
Pat Dubar - vocals (formerly of Uniform Choice)
Louis Svitek - guitar (formerly of M.O.D., Ministry)
Frank Ciampi - bass
Shawn Johnson - drums

Past
Jason Coppola - guitar (formerly of Chemical Waste)
John Monte - bass (formerly of M.O.D., Chemical Waste, Human Waste Project, Evil Mothers, Dragpipe)
Reed St. Mark - drums (formerly of Celtic Frost)
Jason Everman - guitar (formerly of Nirvana, Soundgarden)
Spike Xavier - bass (formerly of Mind Over Four)

Timeline

Discography
 Albums
Mind Funk (1991) (Epic)
Dropped (1993) (Megaforce Records)
People Who Fell from the Sky (1995) (Music For Nations)

Singles and EPs
Touch You (EP, 1991) (Epic)
"Big House Burning" (single, 1991) (Epic)

References

External links
 Music Life Radio Interview with Jason Everman Sept 2010

American alternative metal musical groups
American funk metal musical groups
American grunge groups
American stoner rock musical groups